The Harlow Homestead is a historic house located in the Cotuit village of Barnstable, Massachusetts.

Description and history 
This -story wood-frame house was built c. 1878 by Elijah Harlow, member of a locally prominent family, and it is remained in his family since then. It is an L-shaped house with a rear extension. It is sheathed with narrow vertical boards (an Italianate element), and has corner pilasters and a wide entablature in the Greek Revival style. A porch wraps around two sides of the house.

The house was listed on the National Register of Historic Places on September 18, 1987.

See also
National Register of Historic Places listings in Barnstable County, Massachusetts

References

Houses in Barnstable, Massachusetts
National Register of Historic Places in Barnstable, Massachusetts
Houses on the National Register of Historic Places in Barnstable County, Massachusetts
Houses completed in 1878
Italianate architecture in Massachusetts
Greek Revival architecture in Massachusetts